Abd al-Malik ibn Rifa'a al-Fahmi was the governor of Egypt for the Umayyad Caliphate in 715–717 and 727.

Abd al-Malik was a member of the Arab settler community in Egypt. In 710, he succeeded his uncle at the post of head of security (sahib al-shurta) for the governor Qurra ibn Sharik al-Absi. When Qurra died in office in 715, he was promoted in his stead, the first governor chosen from the local Arabs after several decades where the post had been filled by various grandees of the Umayyad family and their court. His period of office was a continuation of Qurra's, and according to the Coptic sources was marked by increasing fiscal oppression, combined with the efforts of the government to clamp down on avoidance of taxation and corvée labour. This included such measures as restricting their ability to travel through the issue of passports, which greatly impeded trade in the province.

In 727 Abd al-Malik was again made governor of Egypt, but he died of an illness after only a few weeks in office and was succeeded by his brother al-Walid ibn Rifa'a al-Fahmi instead.

References

Sources 
 
 
 

7th-century births
727 deaths
8th-century Umayyad governors of Egypt
Umayyad governors of Egypt
7th-century Arabs
8th-century Arabs